The 2003 Tulsa Golden Hurricane football team represented the University of Tulsa as a member of the Western Athletic Conference (WAC) during the 2003 NCAA Division I-A football season. Led by first-year head coach Steve Kragthorpe, the Golden Hurricane compiled an overall record of 8–5 with a mark of 6–2 in conference play, tying for second place in the WAC. Tulsa was invited to the Humanitarian Bowl, where the Golden Hurricane lost to Georgia Tech. The team played home games at Skelly Stadium in Tulsa, Oklahoma.

Schedule

References

Tulsa
Tulsa Golden Hurricane football seasons
Tulsa Golden Hurricane football